Jay Berger was the defending champion, but did not participate this year.

David Wheaton won the title, defeating Mark Kaplan 6–4, 6–3 in the final.

Seeds
A champion seed is indicated in bold text while text in italics indicates the round in which that seed was eliminated.

  Richey Reneberg (second round)
  Jim Grabb (first round)
  David Wheaton (champion)
  Scott Davis (first round)
  Dan Goldie (first round)
  Lawson Duncan (first round)
  Derrick Rostagno (quarterfinals)
  MaliVai Washington (semifinals)

Draw

External links
 Singles draw

Singles